Kodra may refer to:

Ibrahim Kodra, Albanian artist
Lindita Kodra, Albanian shooter
Kodra, Kyiv Oblast, a city in Ukraine
Kodra grain (Paspalum scrobiculatum), a traditional grain cultivated in India and Africa